Broxtowe is a parliamentary constituency in Nottinghamshire, England, represented in the House of Commons of the UK Parliament since 2019 by Darren Henry, a Conservative.

Constituency profile
Broxtowe is a suburban constituency in Nottinghamshire, to the west of the city of Nottingham, and almost identical in character to the seat of Gedling east of Nottingham. Broxtowe lies along the county's western border with Erewash in Derbyshire. The constituency covers the vast majority of the Borough of Broxtowe (except the town of Eastwood which is in the Ashfield constituency), its name derived from the old Broxtowe wapentake of Nottinghamshire, which covered a larger area. The constituency includes the East Midlands towns of Beeston, Stapleford and Kimberley, and generally affluent villages such as Attenborough, home of Attenborough Nature Reserve, a local attraction. Beeston is the largest town and the base of the borough council, and is on the border of the main campus of the University of Nottingham, as such is home to a large number of the university's staff and a small number of students. It is also home to the headquarters of the local company Boots. 

It is a marginal seat between the Labour and the Conservative parties. At the 2017 snap election, less than two percentage points separated the Conservative and Labour parties, with Labour's main strength in Beeston and Kimberley, with the smaller residential towns such as Chilwell mostly Conservative.

Boundaries

1918–1950: The Urban Districts of Arnold, Eastwood, Hucknall, and Kirkby-in-Ashfield, and in the Rural District of Basford the parishes of Annesley, Bestwood Park, Brinsley, Calverton, Felley, Greasley, Kimberley, Lambley, Linby, Newstead, Papplewick, Selston, and Woodborough.

1950–1955: The Urban Districts of Eastwood, Hucknall, and Kirkby-in-Ashfield, and in the Rural District of Basford the parishes of Annesley, Awsworth, Bestwood Park, Brinsley, Cossall, Felley, Greasley, Kimberley, Linby, Newstead, Nuthall, Papplewick, Selston, Strelley, and Trowell.

1983–2010: The Borough of Broxtowe wards of Attenborough, Awsworth and Cossall, Beeston Central, Beeston North East, Beeston North West, Beeston Rylands, Bramcote, Chilwell East, Chilwell West, Greasley, Kimberley, Nuthall, Stapleford East, Stapleford North, Stapleford West, Strelley and Trowell, and Toton.

2010–present: The Borough of Broxtowe wards of Attenborough, Awsworth, Beeston Central, Beeston North, Beeston Rylands, Beeston West, Bramcote, Chilwell East, Chilwell West, Cossall and Kimberley, Greasley Giltbrook and Newthorpe, Nuthall East and Strelley, Nuthall West and Greasley Watnall, Stapleford North, Stapleford South East, Stapleford South West, Toton and Chilwell Meadows, and Trowell.

Members of Parliament

MPs 1918–1955

MPs since 1983

Elections

Elections in the 2010s

Elections in the 2000s

Elections in the 1990s

Elections in the 1980s

Elections in the 1950s

Election in the 1940s

Elections in the 1930s

Elections in the 1920s

Elections in the 1910s

See also
List of parliamentary constituencies in Nottinghamshire
Opinion polling for the next United Kingdom general election in individual constituencies

Notes

References

External links 
nomis Constituency Profile for Broxtowe — presenting data from the ONS annual population survey and other official statistics.

Borough of Broxtowe
Parliamentary constituencies in Nottinghamshire
Constituencies of the Parliament of the United Kingdom established in 1918
Constituencies of the Parliament of the United Kingdom disestablished in 1955
Constituencies of the Parliament of the United Kingdom established in 1983